Arundhati may refer to:

 Arundhati (Hinduism), the Hindu goddess of the sky, stars and night time
 Arundhati (given name)
 Arundhati (actress) (born 1990), Indian film actress and model
 Arundhati (epic), a 1994 Hindi epic poem
 Arundhati (1967 film), a Oriya film directed by Prafulla Sengupta
 Arundhati (2009 film), a Telugu film directed by Kodi Ramakrishna
 Arundhati (2011 TV series), a Marathi TV series produced by Balaji Telefilms
 Arundhati (2014 film), an Indian Bengali horror thriller film 
 Arundhati (2016 TV series), a 2016-2017 Tamil-language mystery soap opera
 Arundhathi (TV series), 2019 Tamil-language supernatural television drama